New Earth Mud is the solo debut studio album of Chris Robinson. It was released October 22, 2002 on Redline Records. Initial pressings came with a bonus DVD, which included a documentary on the making of the album and several acoustic live performances. The album was Robinson's first solo effort after a dozen years recording and touring with the band he formed with his brother Rich Robinson during the 1980s, the Black Crowes, which had gone on hiatus after the completion of its 2001 tour in support of the album Lions. The songs "Sunday Sound" and "Ride" have gone on to become staples of Robinson's live shows.

Track listing
All songs written by Chris Robinson, except where noted.

"Safe in the Arms of Love" – 4:14
"Silver Car" (Robinson, Eddie Harsch, Paul Stacey) – 4:47
"Kids That Ain't Got None" (Robinson, Harsch, Stacey) – 5:56
"Could You Really Love Me?" (Robinson, Stacey) – 4:06
"Untangle My Mind" – 5:34
"Fables" – 3:21
"Sunday Sound" (Robinson, Marc Ford) – 5:01
"Barefoot by the Cherry Tree" (Robinson, Stacey) – 5:55
"Katie Dear" – 5:50
"Ride" – 5:13
"Better Than the Sun" (Robinson, Dean DeLeo) – 5:16
"She's on Her Way" – 4:32

Personnel
Musicians
 Gordie Johnson – standup bass
 Matt Jones – clavinet, Fender Rhodes, harpsichord, piano, Wurlitzer
 Chris Robinson – acoustic guitar, electric guitar, percussion, vocals
 Jeremy Stacey – drums
 Paul Stacey – bass, acoustic guitar, baritone guitar, electric guitar, mini moog, organ, piano

Production
 Darren Ankenman – photography
 Ian Cooper – mastering
 Regan Hagar – design, layout design
 Steve Payne – assistant engineer
 Chris Robinson – art direction, producer
 George Seara – assistant engineer
 Paul Stacey – mixing, producer

References

2002 debut albums
Chris Robinson (singer) albums
Albums produced by Chris Robinson (singer)